Alano di Piave is a comune (municipality) in the province of Belluno in the Italian region of Veneto, located about  northwest of Venice and about  southwest of Belluno.

Alano di Piave borders the following municipalities: Cavaso del Tomba, Paderno del Grappa, Pederobba, Possagno, Quero Vas, Segusino, Seren del Grappa, Valdobbiadene.

History 
The first attestation of Alano whose etymology should be traced back, according to some, to the barbaric horde of the Alans, who descended there from the North, and, according to others, more modestly, to the working of wool, once widespread in the area, is found in a document of the eighth century.

Subsequently, starting from the X-XI century, the information on the community thickens: the confusion present in the maps of the time is the clear consequence of the continuous succession of different governments in the control of Alano and the neighboring territories, constantly disputed between the various lords of Feltre and Treviso. However, the Alanese not only suffered the sad effects of these struggles: in fact, they had to endure the fighting that dragged on until the beginning of the 1500s, at the time of the war of Cambrai - for the possession of the fourteenth-century fortress of Castelnuovo, which dominated the streets road and river. Nonetheless, the local people, mostly devoted to sheep farming due to the low income deriving from agriculture, very difficult in such a varied and not flat area, went through quiet periods for three centuries starting from the first decades of the 16th century and thriving; he specialized more and more in fruitful craft activities such as the working of wool and iron and the production of lime. The proximity of the Piave made Fener a discrete commercial centre.

The dramatic events that took place in the Alano basin during the First World War - located in a neutral zone and therefore hit by Austrian and Italian artillery at the same time
they literally devastated its territory. Thus the Alans looked to Europe and the Americas, to which they emigrated in large numbers as their ancestors had done between the 1800s and 1900s.

No less tragic were the years of the Second World War, also followed by a conspicuous migratory flow directed towards Belgium, Germany and France.

Monuments and places of interest 

 Parish Church of Sant'Antonio Abate
The parish of Alano di Piave is inserted in the vicariate of Quero-Valdobbiadene, part of the diocese of Padua.

Originally, the main church of Alano was that of San Pietro, mentioned for the first time in the papal tenth of 1297 as a dependency of the parish church of Quero. The pastoral visit of 1535 attests to the transfer of the Blessed Sacrament and the baptismal font to the church of Sant'Antonio Abate, in a more central position, which since then has become the place of worship of reference for the town.

Until the reconstruction of 1760-1778, concluded with the consecration of 1792, it maintained the ownership of both saints. The bell tower was built in the second half of the 19th century. Severely damaged during the Great War, it was promptly restored.

At the back of the presbytery there is a Madonna and Child in glory and saints, a canvas by an anonymous Venetian from the second half of the eighteenth century. To the right of the high altar is a praying Angel in carved and painted wood, made in the first half of the 20th century by an unknown artist. In the first chapel on the left stands a statue of St. Anthony of Padua with baby Jesus, sculpted by Gabriele Brunelli in the second half of the seventeenth century.

Demographic evolution

Foreign ethnic groups and minorities 

As of 31 December 2021, there were 390 foreign residents in the municipality, or 14.6% of the population. The most consistent groups are listed below:

 China, 130
 Morocco, 91
 Dominican Republic, 35
  Romania, 18
  Croatia, 17

In percentage terms, Alano di Piave is the first municipality in the province for the number of foreign residents.

Economy 
A part of the inhabitants is still dedicated to agriculture and livestock. Cereals, vegetables, fodder, vines and orchards are grown and cattle, pigs, goats, sheep, horses and poultry are raised. In recent years Alano has experienced a significant increase in craft activities, particularly in the eyewear, chandeliers and carpentry sectors. The town has only one hotel, three restaurants and a holiday home which, born as a cultural center, now hosts artists and the elderly. The industrial sector is present with the food, textile, construction, wood, clothing, metal products, agricultural machinery and furniture sectors.

Infrastructure and transport

Streets 
The village is crossed by the 348 Feltrina state road.

An inhabitant of the hamlet of Fener is a frequent presence on the southern lane of regional road 348 to the point of ending up mapped on Google Maps and has been included as a "tourist attraction".

Railways 
The town is served by the Alano-Fener-Valdobbiadene station on the Calalzo-Padua railway.

Administration

References

External links 
 Unione Montana Feltrina

Cities and towns in Veneto
Articles which contain graphical timelines